Arastichus is a genus of hymenopteran insects of the family Eulophidae. It is only known from the neotropics. At least one of the three known species induces galls on plants in the family Araceae.

References

Eulophidae

Taxa described in 2022
Gall-inducing insects
Hymenoptera genera
Taxa named by Michael W. Gates
Taxa named by Y. Miles Zhang